Pedro de Paz (born 26 October 1969 in Madrid) is a Spanish writer.

After working in computing for more than 15 years, de Paz decided in 2002 to try a career in literature. His first novel, El hombre que mató a Durruti (2004), won the José Saramago Novel Competition . The novel was translated into English and published by ChristieBooks in its Read and Noir series. De Paz' literary output is mainly in the field of police and crime novels. He also writes articles and short stories, some of them published in various anthologies and magazines.

Bibliography

In Spanish

El documento Saldaña (Ed. Planeta, 2008; Círculo de Lectores, 2009),  ; 
"Mala Suerte", in: La lista negra (Ed. Salto de Página, 2009)  Collective anthology of short stories.
Muñecas tras el cristal (Ed. El Tercer Nombre, 2006), 
"Revenge Blues", in: La vida es un bar (Ed. Amargord, 2006)  Collective anthology of short stories.
El hombre que mató a Durruti (Ed. Germanía, 2004), .

In English

The man who killed Durruti (Ed. ChristieBooks, 2005)

External links 
 Writer's page

1969 births
Living people
Writers from Madrid
Spanish male writers